Uarbry is a town in the Warrumbungle Shire of  New South Wales, Australia.  At the 2016 census, Uarbry had a population of 49.

References

Towns in New South Wales
Warrumbungle Shire